Nico Kaufmann ( 24 June 1916 – 23 November 1996) was a Swiss pianist and composer.

Life
Kaufmann was born in Zürich. In addition to his studies at the Zürich Conservatory he was for a short time (1937) Vladimir Horowitz's only disciple during his time living in Europe. He then became the Cabaret Cornichon's arranger and musical conductor, and took part at the VII Concours de Geneve (1945), which he won.

He died in Zürich.

References

1916 births
1996 deaths
20th-century classical composers
20th-century classical pianists
Swiss classical composers
Swiss classical pianists
20th-century Swiss composers